Harry Martineau  is a fictional British police detective created by Maurice Procter. He is a Chief Inspector in the industrial Northern city of Granchester, which was inspired by Manchester. Procter, himself a former police officer, wrote fourteen novels in the series published between 1954 and 1968. Martineau has been described as a transitional figure in detective fiction standing between the Golden Age detectives such as Ngaio Marsh's Roderick Alleyn and Josephine Tey's Inspector Grant and the newer fashion for police procedurals.

Novels
 Hell Is a City (1954)
 The Midnight Plumber (1957)
 Man in Ambush (1958)
 Killer At Large (1959)
 Devil's Due (1960)
 The Devil Was Handsome (1961)
 A Body to Spare (1962)
 Moonlight Flitting (1963)
 Two Men in Twenty (1964)
 Death Has a Shadow (1965)
 His Weight in Gold (1966)
 Rogue Running (1966)
 Exercise Hoodwink (1967)
 Hideaway (1968)

Film adaptation
In 1960 the first novel in the series was adapted into the film Hell Is a City directed by Val Guest and starring Stanley Baker as Martineau. The film was shot on location in Manchester.

References

Bibliography 
 Barnes, Melvyn P. Murder in Print: A Guide to Two Centuries of Crime Fiction. Barn Owl Books, 1986.
 Goble, Alan. The Complete Index to Literary Sources in Film. Walter de Gruyter, 1999.
 Herbert, Rosemary. Whodunit?: A Who's Who in Crime & Mystery Writing. Oxford University Press, 2003.
 James, Russell. Great British Fictional Detectives. Remember When, 2009.
 Mitchell, Neil. Directory of World Cinema: Britain 2. Intellect Books, 2015.
 Reilly, John M. Twentieth Century Crime & Mystery Writers. Springer, 2015.
 Triplow, Nick. Getting Carter: Ted Lewis and the Birth of Brit Noir. Oldcastle Books,2017.

Literary characters introduced in 1954
Harry Martineau
Fictional British police detectives